An unofficial referendum on "peace, life and liberty" was held in Colombia on 26 October 1997, alongside regional and departmental elections. The referendum was organised as a private initiative, but the ballots were counted by the electoral authorities.

Whilst the referendum and elections were boycotted in rural areas due to pressure from guerrilla groups, urban voters voted heavily in favour, with over 90% of voters supporting the proposal.

Results

References

1997 referendums
1997
1997 in Colombia